Rex Lee Jim (born 1962) is an American politician, Past Navajo Council Delegate and Former Vice President of the Navajo Nation who served under President Ben Shelly.

References

External links

1962 births
Living people
People from Apache County, Arizona
Vice Presidents of the Navajo Nation
Members of the Navajo Nation Council
20th-century Native Americans
21st-century Native Americans
Native American people from Arizona